Thor Fjord is a fjord in Peary Land, far northern Greenland. 

Robert Peary did not explore the Frederick E. Hyde Fjord owing to thick fog at its mouth. The inner fjord branches were mapped and named by Lauge Koch in the course of aerial surveys from the 1920s onwards.

Geography
It is located between Freja Fjord to the east and Odin Fjord to the west on the same side.

 Mount Wistar, the highest point of the area, rises to the east of the inner section. To the west lies the Heimdal Ice Cap. There is no glacier at the head of Thor Fjord.

See also
List of fjords of Greenland

References

External links
Geographical Items on North Greenland - Encyclopedia Arctica XIV

Frederick E. Hyde Fjord